Rabbit Island is a rocky islet lying off Tarawhenua Point on the north-west coast of Pitt Island in the Chatham Islands group of New Zealand.  About 300 m long by 200 m across, its highest point is 44 m above sea level.  It has been identified as an Important Bird Area by BirdLife International because it supports breeding colonies of the critically endangered Chatham and endangered Pitt shags.

See also

 Desert island
 List of islands

References

Islands of the Chatham Islands
Important Bird Areas of the Chatham Islands
Uninhabited islands of New Zealand
Seabird colonies